Kish District is a district (bakhsh) in Bandar Lengeh County, Hormozgan Province, Iran. At the 2006 census, its population was 21,637, in 6,344 families.  The District has one city: Kish. The District has two rural districts (dehestan): Kish Rural District and Lavan Rural District.

References 

Districts of Hormozgan Province
Bandar Lengeh County